Shivalik Public School is a higher-secondary co-education private school.

References 

Co-educational schools in India
High schools and secondary schools in Patiala
Educational institutions established in 1994
1994 establishments in Punjab, India